Julia Candace Strauss (born 1961) is an American political scientist, Sinologist and sociologist. She is a Professor at Department of Politics and International Studies, SOAS University of London.

Biography 
After receiving a Bachelor's degree in Chinese Language and European History from Connecticut College in 1983, Strauss received an Master's degree and PhD from the Department of Political Science at the University of California, Berkeley in 1984 and 1991. In 1994, Strauss moved to the Department of Political and International Studies at SOAS University of London. From 2002 to 2011, she served as Editor of The China Quarterly. In 2013, she was promoted to Professor.

Publications

Monographs 
State Formation in China and Taiwan: Bureaucracy, Campaign, and Performance (2019)
Strong Institutions in Weak Polities: State Building in Republican China, 1927-1940 (1998)

Single edited volumes 
The History of the People's Republic of China (2006)

Co-edited volumes 
 State Formations: Global Histories and Cultures of Statehood (2018)
From the Great Wall to the New World: China and Latin American in the 21st Century (2012)
Gender in Flux: Agency and Its Limits in Contemporary China (2011)
China and Africa: Emerging Patterns in Globalization and Development (2009)
Staging Politics: Power and Performance in Asia and Africa (2007)

References

External links 

Living people
1961 births
Academics of SOAS University of London
American political scientists
American sinologists
American sociologists
American expatriates in England
Connecticut College alumni
UC Berkeley College of Letters and Science alumni